The jacobins are two species of hummingbirds in the genus Florisuga.

Taxonomy
The genus Florisuga was introduced in 1850 by the French naturalist Charles Lucien Bonaparte. The name combines the Latin flos, floris meaning "flower" with sugere meaning "to suck". The type species is the white-necked jacobin.

The genus contains the following species:

References

Florisuga
Taxa named by Charles Lucien Bonaparte
Taxonomy articles created by Polbot